Malott is a surname. Notable people with the surname include:

Ally Malott (born 1992), American basketball player
Deane Waldo Malott (1898–1996), American academic and administrator
Richard Malott (born 1936), American professor
Wes Malott (born 1976), American ten-pin bowler